ASPL can refer to:
 American Society for Pharmacy Law
 An alternate name for ASPSCR1 (derived from "Alveolar soft part sarcoma locus")